Alex Winwood (born 25 June 1997) is an Australian boxer. He competed in the men's flyweight event at the 2020 Summer Olympics. In the round of 32 he was beaten by Patrick Chinyemba from Zambia on points.

Early years 
Winwood is a Noongar man from Mandurah in Perth. He started boxing as a 15-year-old in high school and he loved it. He started training outside of school at the Eureka Boxing Club in Mandurah, where he was coached by Brian Satori.

Winwood is the great-nephew of former professional Brian Bennell.

Achievements 
Winwood participated in the AIBA World Boxing Championships. He won the national flyweight title in December 2019,

Winwood did not qualify for the 2016 Rio Olympics. He then earned his Olympic spot at the 2020 Asia and Oceania Olympic Qualification event in Amman, Jordan. He came into the final round a point behind his Iranian opponent, Omid Ahmadi Safa, but walked away with a victory and qualification for his Olympic debut at Tokyo 2020.

References

External links
 

1997 births
Living people
Australian male boxers
Olympic boxers of Australia
Boxers at the 2020 Summer Olympics
People from Bunbury, Western Australia
Sportsmen from Western Australia